The 2001 NCAA Division II Men's Lacrosse Championship was the 17th annual tournament to determine the national champions of NCAA Division II men's college lacrosse in the United States.

The final was played at Yurcak Field at Rutgers University in Piscataway, New Jersey. 

Adelphi defeated Limestone in the championship game, 14–10, to claim the Panthers' seventh Division II national title.

The tournament field increased for the first time under the second incarnation of the NCAA's Division II men's lacrosse tournament, increasing from two to four teams. 

A women's Division II tournament was also held for the first time in 2001.

Bracket

See also
2001 NCAA Division II Women's Lacrosse Championship
2001 NCAA Division I Men's Lacrosse Championship
2001 NCAA Division III Men's Lacrosse Championship

References

NCAA Division II Men's Lacrosse Championship
NCAA Division II Men's Lacrosse Championship
NCAA Division II Men's Lacrosse